Nightmare at Bittercreek is a 1988 American-Australian made-for-television action-thriller film directed by Tim Burstall.

Phoenix Entertainment Group and Swanton Films produced the film. The VHS version was distributed by Lions Gate Entertainment, while the DVD version was distributed by Trinity Home Entertainment.

Plot
The film is about a group of women on a hiking trip who are chased by deadly racist survivalists.

Cast
 Lindsay Wagner as Nita Daniels
 Tom Skerritt as Ding
 Constance McCashin as Connie Senia
 Joanna Cassidy as Allison Shapiro
 Jane Mortil as Tracy Senia
 Dwight McFee as Bully

References

External links

 

1988 television films
1988 films
1988 action thriller films
Action television films
American thriller television films
CBS network films
Films directed by Tim Burstall
1980s American films